Parade is the eighth studio album by American recording artist Prince, and the third and final album where the Revolution is billed. It also was the soundtrack album to the 1986 film Under the Cherry Moon, directed by and starring Prince. It was released on March 31, 1986 by Paisley Park Records and Warner Bros. Records.

Parade eschews the guitar and rock elements of Prince's 1984 album Purple Rain in favor of the psychedelic pop style he explored on Around the World in a Day (1985), austerely produced funk, and soundtrack compositions. After the critical disappointment of his 1985 album Around the World in a Day, Parade was released to acclaim from music critics. "Kiss" reached number one on the Billboard Hot 100. Parade was certified Platinum by the Recording Industry Association of America (RIAA) in June 1986.

Parade was named one of the best albums of 1986 by The Village Voice and NME magazine, who named it their Album of the Year.

Background 

Parade was the follow-up to Around the World in a Day and the soundtrack to Prince's second film. The album sees Prince further diversifying musically, adding orchestrations to his music. Prince also displayed a new image with Parade: his trademark ruffled shirts, wild curly hair, and purple outfits, which defined his look from 1981's Controversy to 1985's Around the World in a Day, were replaced by slicked-back hair and dress suits. The first single, "Kiss", was a number one hit, and the album as a whole was well received in the United States. Europe further embraced the album, and for the first time in Prince's career European album sales eclipsed those in the United States. While Parade was the last official release with the Revolution, a follow up called Dream Factory was recorded. Its release was canceled when Prince disbanded the group.

Music and lyrics 
Parade eschews the guitar and rock elements of Prince's 1984 album Purple Rain in favor of the neo-psychedelic style he explored on Around the World in a Day (1985), austerely produced funk, and soundtrack compositions. According to Blender magazine's Keith Harris, Parade "makes a pop cavalcade out of the same psychedelic affectations" of Around the World in a Day. Robert Christgau of The Village Voice viewed it as a modern "fusion of Freshs foundation and Sgt. Peppers filigrees", with songs he described as baroque pop creations. According to PopMatters editor Quentin B. Huff, "Parade doesn't sound like anything else in the Prince canon. The album is a blend of jazz, soul, and a certain French undercurrent, probably absorbed from the film being set in France."

Parade is bookended by two songs—"Christopher Tracy's Parade" and "Sometimes It Snows in April"—that reference Christopher Tracy, the protagonist from Under the Cherry Moon. The latter song is an acoustic ballad with chromatic choruses and sentimental lyrics bidding farewell to Tracy. Christgau wrote that the album's lyrics suggest that Prince sings as Tracy, although he cannot be certain. Parade also features some French lyrics and chanson arrangements, which refer to the film's French setting.

Release and reception 

Parade was released on March 31, 1986 to acclaim from music critics, who viewed it as a creative comeback after the critical disappointment of Around the World in a Day. In a contemporary review for The New York Times, John Rockwell said that the album succeeds in part because of the more aggressive songs, "in which Prince chooses to play up the black side of his multifaceted musical sensibility." The Sunday Times found its musical scope "stunning", and the Detroit Free Press called the album "a confirmation of Prince's place as a superior melodist, arranger, and player, as well as a celebration of his creativity." Hi-Fi News & Record Review called songs such as "New Position and "Girls and Boys" well-crafted funk and said that "when Prince opts to go completely daft, as he does on 'Do U Lie'... even then the result is somehow endearing and instantly likeable."

Commercially, Parade charted at number 3 on the pop chart and at number 2 on the R&B chart, while selling 1 million copies in the United States, where Prince's sales had decreased. However it garnered him a new commercial audience in Europe and sold 2 million copies internationally. The album finished 25th in the voting for The Village Voices annual Pazz & Jop critics poll. Christgau, the poll's creator, ranked it as the 33rd best album of the year on his own list. NME magazine named it their album of the year for 1986.

In a retrospective review for AllMusic, Stephen Thomas Erlewine viewed Parade as a musically diverse near-masterpiece that is given depth by Prince's "weird religious and sexual metaphors". Simon Price later wrote in The Guardian that it was "the sound of Prince at his most effortless and assured. Cohesive and ice cream-cool, nobody would guess it was a soundtrack for a (sub-par) film. And it has 'Kiss' on it." In a less enthusiastic review for Entertainment Weekly, David Browne said the record's ornate ballads and inconsistent material made it more self-indulgent than Around the World in a Day. According to Mosi Reeves of Rhapsody, Prince's die-hard fans viewed the album as a charming mix of funk, jazz, and pop rock styles, but some detractors felt that its music was overblown. Reeves himself said that "this stylistic departure is an anomaly". In rapper Chuck D's opinion, Prince "turned off a lot of the black followers [with the album]. I couldn't understand that. People don't want artists to endlessly repeat themselves, yet they can't tolerate change either. Prince changes all the time, always working on the public's imagination, always trying to keep ahead of them."

Track listing

Personnel

 Prince – lead vocals and various instruments
 Lisa Coleman – backing vocals (1-3, 6), keyboards and vocals (5, 8, 11, 12)
 Wendy Melvoin – backing vocals (1, 2, 6), lead vocals (3), guitar and vocals (5, 8, 11, 12)
 Doctor Fink – keyboards (5, 8, 11)
 Brown Mark – bass (5, 8, 11)
 Bobby Z. – drums and percussion (5, 8, 11)
 Sheila E. – backing vocals (5), cowbells (6), drums (6, 7)
 Eric Leeds – saxophone (5, 8)
 Atlanta Bliss – trumpet (5, 8)
 Miko Weaver – rhythm guitar (8)
 Jonathan Melvoin – drums (9)
 Chuck Domanico - guitar

 Susannah Melvoin – backing vocals (1, 5, 11)
 Marie France – vocals (5)
 Sandra Francisco – vocals (9)
 Mazarati – backing vocals (10)
 Craig Powell – guitar (10)
 Tony Christian – backing vocals (10)
 Marr Star – keyboards (10)
 Aaron Keith – keyboards (10)
 Kevin Patrick – drums (10)
 Clare Fischer – orchestral arrangements
 Bill Watrous - trombone

Charts

Year-end charts

Certifications

References

Further reading

External links
 Parade at Discogs
 Parade at Prince Vault

1986 soundtrack albums
Prince (musician) soundtracks
Prince (musician) albums
Albums produced by Prince (musician)
Paisley Park Records soundtracks
Paisley Park Records albums
1986 albums
Albums arranged by Clare Fischer
Albums recorded at Sunset Sound Recorders
Musical film soundtracks